Adolfas Varanauskas (4 February 1934 – 12 January 2007) was a Lithuanian athlete. He competed in the men's shot put at the 1964 Summer Olympics, representing the Soviet Union.

References

1934 births
2007 deaths
Athletes (track and field) at the 1964 Summer Olympics
Lithuanian male shot putters
Olympic athletes of the Soviet Union
Place of birth missing
Soviet male shot putters